Pethia meingangbii is a species of cyprinid native to freshwater habitats in Manipur in northeastern India and  Myanmar.

It is known from nine locations, but it is common in these areas and lacks major threats. It is sometimes caught and eaten by locals.

References 

Singh, L. 2015. Pethia meingangbii. The IUCN Red List of Threatened Species 2015: e.T168547A6512154. . Downloaded on 5 April 2016.

Pethia
Barbs (fish)
Fish described in 2003